Orlovsky District is an administrative and municipal district (raion), one of the thirty-nine in Kirov Oblast, Russia. It is located in the central part of the oblast. Its administrative center is the town of Orlov. Population:  16,190 (2002 Census);  The population of Orlov accounts for 53.8% of the district's total population.

History
Until 1992, the district was called Khalturinsky.

People
 Stepan Khalturin (1857-1882)

References

Notes

Sources

Districts of Kirov Oblast
